Floyd E. Kellam High School is a public high school in Virginia Beach, Virginia. Located in the city's southern section, in Princess Anne, the school first opened in 1962, named after Judge Floyd Eaton Kellam. Kellam High School serves a large portion of the city of Virginia Beach, with the attendance boundary extending south to the North Carolina border. Kellam High moved into a new facility in 2014.

Floyd Kellam High School is fully accredited under Virginia's Standards of Learning program. The school is the third-oldest in Virginia Beach, next to Princess Anne High School and Frank W. Cox High School. Kellam has also been a blue ribbon school in the Fine Arts Department for the years 2006 and 2007.

Sports 
Virginia State Championships:
 1994 - Gymnastics
 2006 - Gymnastics
 2010 - Gymnastics
 2013 - Gymnastics
 2016 - Gymnastics

Demographics and Population 
As of 2020 Floyd E. Kellam had 1,947 total students, slightly down the previous years 1,957 students. 

2020 by grade student population: 

 Grade 9 - 507
 Grade 10 - 480 
 Grade 11 - 459
 Grade 12 - 507

2020 student racial and ethnic group membership population:

 Asian - 3.3%
 Black - 4.6%
 Hispanic - 8.2%
 Multiple Races - 6.2%

 Native American - 0.2%
 Native Hawaiian - 0.4%
 White - 77.1%

Notable alumni
 1971 - Herbert Scott, Dallas Cowboys 
 1989 - Matt Williams, Milwaukee Brewers 
 2002 - Ryan Zimmerman, Washington Nationals
 2005 - Jamelle Bouie, New York Times columnist
 2006 - Ian Thomas, Atlanta Braves
 2017 - Tomas Franzese, journalist at Digital Trends

See also
AAA Eastern Region
AAA Beach District

References

External links
 Kellam Band
 Virginia Beach City Public Schools
 Virginia Beach school mascots and colors 
 School Report Card 
 Kellam HS official site

Educational institutions established in 1962
High schools in Virginia Beach, Virginia
Public high schools in Virginia
1962 establishments in Virginia